The Chanrion Hut French: (Cabane de Chanrion ) is a mountain hut located in the upper Val de Bagnes in the canton of Valais in Switzerland. It lies in an isolated area south of Lac de Mauvoisin at an altitude of 2,462 metres, at the foot of Pointe d'Otemma. The easiest access is from the north (road to Mauvoisin). 

The hut is owned by the Swiss Alpine Club.

External links 
Chanrion Hut on SAC website
Official site
Chanrion Hut on mountwiki.com

Mountain huts in Switzerland
Mountain huts in the Alps